Dan Santat (born 1975) is an American author and illustrator known for his children's book The Adventures of Beekle: The Unimaginary Friend, which won the 2015 Caldecott Medal for distinguished illustration.  He also wrote The Guild of Geniuses and created the Disney Channel animated series The Replacements.

Biography
Santat was born in 1975 to Thai immigrants in Brooklyn before moving to California when Santat was three. After attending high school at Adolfo Camarillo High School, Santat graduated from the University of California at San Diego with a bachelor's degree in microbiology. Santat then attended the Art Center College of Design, graduating with distinction. While there he became friends with illustrator Peter Brown.

Santat's first children's book, The Guild of Geniuses, was published in 2004 by Arthur A Levine books. He followed that up illustrating the first Nanny Piggins book written by R. A. Spratt, and the first Otto Undercover book series written by Rhea Perlman. Since then he has illustrated for other authors, including Dan Gutman, Barbara Jean Hicks and Anne Isaacs.

In 2005, Santat created the show The Replacements for Disney Channel. Based on a children's book idea he was going to write, the show premiered in July 2006. Santat has spoken of his admiration of those who can do the drawing necessary for animation. He spoke of the challenges of working on The Replacements, "Working creatively with a large corporation and numerous executives was rather frustrating because there was a feeling that there was a process of homogenization to try to appeal to as many kids as possible" and says he prefers the freedom of illustrative styles afforded by book editors.

Santat is also a commercial illustrator, with such clients as The Wall Street Journal, Esquire, Village Voice, GQ Russia, Macworld, Macy's, and many others.  His work has also appeared at gallery shows - including the I Am 8 Bit art show in 2006, 2007, and 2008. In 2010 he turned down the opportunity to create Google Doodles not wanting to abandon his dream of making children's books.

Santat has completed illustrations for over 60 books, 14 of which were published, in 2014 alone.

Santat lives in Southern California with his wife Leah, his sons Alek and Kyle, a bird, three dogs, and two cats.

Select bibliography
Author
 The Guild of Geniuses (2004)
 Sidekicks (2011)
 The Adventures of Beekle: The Unimaginary Friend (2014)
 Are We There Yet? (2016)
 After the Fall: How Humpty Dumpty Got Back Up Again (2017)
 The Aquanaut (2022)

Illustrator
 Crankenstein (2013) & A Crankenstein Valentine (2014) written by Samantha Berger
 Ricky Ricotta's Mighty Robot (2014–2016) (redrawn book series written by Dav Pilkey)
 Drawn Together (2018) written by Minh Lê

Notes

External links 

 

Living people
American children's book illustrators
American children's writers
Showrunners
1975 births
Caldecott Medal winners
American people of Thai descent
American writers
Disney Television Animation people